The Tucson Citizen was a daily newspaper in Tucson, Arizona. It was founded by Richard C. McCormick with John Wasson as publisher and editor on October 15, 1870, as the Arizona Citizen.

When it ceased printing on May 16, 2009, the daily circulation was approximately 17,000, down from a high of 60,000 in the 1960s. The Citizen published as Tucson's afternoon paper, six days per week (except Sunday, when only the Arizona Daily Star (Tucson's morning paper during the week) was published as part of the two papers' joint operating agreement).

The Tucson Citizen was the oldest continuously published newspaper in Arizona at the time it ceased publication.

History
Founder Richard C. McCormick had originally been the owner of the Arizonan. However, when the editor of the Arizonan refused to support McCormick's re-election as congressional delegate for the territory of Arizona, McCormick took the press and started the Arizona Citizen with Wasson. During the mid-1880s, the newspaper was known as the Tucson Weekly Citizen. Allan Brown Jaynes was owner, manager and editor of the Tucson Citizen between 1901 and 1920. He was very involved in the statehood of Arizona and is in the Arizona Newspaper Hall of Fame. William A. Small, his wife, and William H. Johnson invested in the newspaper in the late 1930s after the death of owner Frank Harris Hitchcock. Johnson sold his share to Small in 1964, and Small turned control over to his son, William A. Small Jr. in 1966 when he retired.

In 1976, the Citizen was sold to Gannett Company, Inc.

Editor and Publisher Michael Chihak retired from the Citizen and Gannett on July 3, 2008. Senior Editor Jennifer Boice and Editorial Editor Mark Kimble co-filled the position in the interim, until the end of publication.
In January 2009, the Gannett Company, owner of the paper since the mid-1970s, announced it would close the Citizen by March 21 if a buyer were not found, though on March 17, 2009, Gannett announced the paper would remain open past that closing date because it was in negotiations with two potential buyers. However, those negotiations did not bear fruit, and on May 15, 2009, Gannett announced that the final print edition would appear the following day, and that the Citizen would thereafter be an Internet publication. The last print edition was delivered on May 16, 2009.

Gannett's attempted sale and closure of the Citizen was the subject of an investigation by the U.S. Justice Department and court action by Arizona Attorney General Terry Goddard.

Online publication 

The successor site, TucsonCitizen.com, edited by the paper's former assistant city editor, Mark B. Evans, described itself as "a compendium of blogs . . . written by Tucsonans for Tucsonans. The bloggers and citizen journalists here provide news, information, opinion, commentary and perspective on the issues, interests and events that affect daily life in the Old Pueblo." It was a division of Gannett Company, Inc., and a partner of Tucson Newspapers. The site closed on January 31, 2014.

Several former Citizen staffers founded TucsonSentinel.com, a nonprofit online news site, after the newspaper was closed.

References

External links
Arizona Citizen on the Arizona Memory Project
Arizona Daily Citizen on the Arizona Memory Project
Arizona Weekly Citizen on the Arizona Memory Project
Weekly Arizona Citizen on the Arizona Memory Project

TucsonCitizen.com

Gannett publications
Mass media in Tucson, Arizona
Newspapers published in Arizona
Publications established in 1870
Online newspapers with defunct print editions
Publications disestablished in 2009
Defunct newspapers published in Arizona
1870 establishments in Arizona Territory
2014 disestablishments in Arizona